Christine Hoberg is an award-winning American singer-songwriter and electronic music producer from Superior, Wisconsin, currently based in Minneapolis.
 She has worked previously with artists such as Flight Facilities, Kiings, Ivan Gough, and Feenixpawl. She is known for her distinctive fluttery voice and live looping.

Biography  
Hoberg was raised in Superior, Wisconsin where she has made music since she was a child beginning with cassette tapes and a karaoke machine. She played in bands while attending Superior High School.  She returns often to perform in the Twin Ports including Duluth's Homegrown Music Festival and FeMN Fest. She also cites the area for a source of inspiration, "The extreme weather, seclusion and endless beauty makes it a super inspiring place to make any form of art.”  

While based out of Brooklyn, Hoberg's most notable appearance as a writer and singer was on Flight Facilities' highest charting single "Clair de Lune". The song came in at number 17 on the Triple J Hottest 100, 2012, went ARIA platinum  and was later featured on the television show Grey's Anatomy. It was remixed by Prins Thomas and Motez (producer) among others.  Hoberg's collaboration with Chris Siegel and Strehlow on 'This is How' earned her 'Song of the Year' at the Radio Milwaukee Music Awards.  She has played across the United States and seven countries, including performing at Iceland Airwaves.

Discography

Albums
"Nice" (2008)
"Ugly" (2010)
"Moonlight Never Shined So Bright"(2011)
"World Within" (2014)
"Christine Hoberg Remixes" (2015)

Appearances and credits

Awards and nominations

AIR Awards
The Australian Independent Record Awards (commonly known informally as AIR Awards) is an annual awards night to recognise, promote and celebrate the success of Australia's Independent Music sector.

|-
| AIR Awards of 2013
| "Clair de Lune"
| Best Independent Dance/Electronic Single or EP
| 
|-

APRA Awards
The APRA Awards are presented annually from 1982 by the Australasian Performing Right Association (APRA), "honouring composers and songwriters". They commenced in 1982.

! 
|-
| 2013 
| "Clair de Lune" (Hugo Gruzman and James Lyell)
| Song of the Year
| 
| 
|-

ARIA Music Awards
The ARIA Music Awards is an annual awards ceremony that recognises excellence, innovation, and achievement across all genres of Australian music.

! 
|-
! scope="row"| 2013
| "Clair de Lune"
| Best Video
| 
| 
|-

References

External links

Living people
21st-century American women singers
Ableton Live users
American experimental musicians
American women pop singers
Art pop musicians
Experimental pop musicians
Feminist musicians
Musicians from Minneapolis
American women in electronic music
Year of birth missing (living people)
21st-century American singers